Joana Eidukonytė (born 2 October 1994) is an inactive Lithuanian tennis player.

Eidukonytė has won one singles title on the ITF Women's Circuit. On 11 July 2016, she reached her career-high singles ranking of world No. 605. On 1 July 2019, she peaked at No. 607 in the doubles rankings.

Eidukonytė has a 16–13 record for Lithuania in Fed Cup competition.

ITF finals

Singles (1–0)

Doubles (0–2)

External links
 
 
 

1994 births
Living people
Sportspeople from Vilnius
Lithuanian female tennis players
Clemson Tigers women's tennis players